This is a list of United Nations Security Council Resolutions 1201 to 1300 adopted between 15 October 1998 and 31 May 2000.

See also 
 Lists of United Nations Security Council resolutions
 List of United Nations Security Council Resolutions 1101 to 1200
 List of United Nations Security Council Resolutions 1301 to 1400

1201